Wang Churan (born 21 January 1999) is a Chinese actress.

Career
In 2017, Wang rose to fame for starring in the historical comedy web series Oh My General. This show earned over 100 million clicking rate within the first day of screening. In addition to acting, Wang also sang two OST, Fushui and Enci, for the web series. She then starred in a spin-off of the series, titled "Lovers Across Space" where she played the leading role. She also sung the soundtracks of the drama.

In 2020, Wang gained further recognition from playing Consort Zhang in the historical drama Serenade of Peaceful Joy. The same year she starred in the family drama The Last Goodbye to Mama. In 2023, Wang starred in the medical romance drama Love Heals as Ruan Liuzheng alongside Peng Guanying.

Filmography

Television series

Discography

References

1999 births
Living people
21st-century Chinese actresses
Chinese television actresses
Affiliated Chinese Opera School of Shanghai Theatre Academy alumni
Shanghai Theatre Academy alumni